Goojje was a spoof website of Google China, which encouraged the real site to stay online and comply with Internet censorship in the People's Republic of China. The site was created after Google executives publicly threatened to shut down the Chinese site following the Operation Aurora cyber attack on Google China, which some computer security experts believe may have come from within China as in the GhostNet cyber spying operation. Google China executives had also publicly condemned the necessity of filtering search results in line with the Golden Shield Project (also known as the Great Firewall of China), which some commentators have stated appears to run counter to Google's mantra, Don't be evil.

Goojje, founded on January 14, 2010 also allows searches to be run, but apparently uses Google and Baidu to do the actual searches.  Google has demanded that Goojje stop using its logo, but Goojje refused until 2011.

Origin

The Chinese name of Goojje can be interpreted as having meaning of "the sister of Google". The jje phoneme is from the word for sister, "jie jie (姐姐)", which mirrors how Google's last syllable (歌) sounds like "ge ge (哥哥)" (brother).

It is said that Goojje is created by a female who is infatuated with Google. Due to Google's withdrawal from China, she decided to build Goojje in memory of it. The website's propaganda is "Goojje it, loneliness all eliminated"

Staff
All staff members of Goojje were born in the generation after the 1980s. Goojje appears to be run by just one person, Huang Jiongxuan, a female college student from Guangdong.  Huang stated in February 2010 that the website had yet to turn a profit, however as of February 2016 it is estimated it now has a net worth of 1530.85CYN (US$235).

Development history of Goojje 

 January 14, 2010: Goojje set up, presenting a new concept: search engine combined with social networking.
 January 16, 2010: Goojje creates motivational video of 2010 with network materials.
 January 20, 2010: Slogan "Goojje it, loneliness all eliminated" becomes an Internet meme.
 January 21, 2010: Goojje network team A1 established with 30 team members.
 January 22, 2010: Goojje breaks through the 1.5 million page view milestone, with the world ranking down to 50,000.
 January 24, 2010: members of network team A1 reaches 600.
 January 25, 2010: Goojje reaches 50,000 registered members. Receives news coverage in more than 100 major media channels.
 January 28, 2010: Goojje begins to attract international attention.
 January 30, 2010: Goojje records more than 2.2 million page views, world ranking goes down to 15,000.
 February 2, 2010: Website undergoes a major revision.
 February 4, 2010: Goojje attacked by unknown hackers. Website down for two weeks
 March 11, 2010: Club of Goojje is online formally.
 March 20, 2010: Goojje headquarters established.
 April 10, 2010: Goojje technology Co., LTD formally established.
 May 20, 2010: Goojje signes with several media companies to establish  strategic partnership.

Goojje's Channel Column 
 Goojje Information
 Goojje Hot
 Goojje Community
 Goojje Intranet
 Goojje Poll
 Goojje Chatterbox
 Goojje Suggestion

See also
Intellectual property in the People's Republic of China

References

External links 
Goojje
Google China
Google China blog

Google
Chinese websites
Copyright infringement
Internet hoaxes